William Joseph Flynn (26 September 1907 – 24 May 1991) was an Australian rules footballer who played with Carlton and South Melbourne in the Victorian Football League (VFL).

Family
The son of Timothy Flynn (1866-1924), and Johanna Flynn (1871-1959), née Ahearn, William Joseph Flynn was born at Drouin, Victoria on 26 September 1907.

He married Kathleen Margaret O'Connor (1908-2002) on 16 May 1942.

Football
Flynn tied with Jack Collins in the 1936 Gippsland Football League's best and fairest award, the Trood Award, when playing with Bairnsdale Football Club.

Notes

References

External links 

Bill Flynn's profile at Blueseum

1907 births
1991 deaths
Carlton Football Club players
Sydney Swans players
Williamstown Football Club players
Australian rules footballers from Victoria (Australia)